The 29th Filmfare Awards were held in 1982.

Films belonging to the Parallel Cinema and Indian New Wave won most of the awards at the ceremony, signaling a trend where filmmakers and audiences were moving towards more meaningful cinema.

Ek Duuje Ke Liye led the ceremony with 13 nominations, followed by Chakra with 6 nominations and Baseraa and Kalyug with 5 nominations each.

Chakra, Ek Duuje Ke Liye, Kalyug & Kudrat won 3 awards each, thus becoming the most-awarded films at the ceremony.

Amitabh Bachchan received dual nominations for Best Actor for his performances in Laawaris and Silsila, but lost to Naseeruddin Shah who won the award for Chakra.

Amjad Khan also received dual nominations for Best Supporting Actor for his performances in Love Story and Yaarana, winning for the latter.

Main awards

Best Film
 Kalyug 
Baseraa
Chakra
Chashme Buddoor
Ek Duuje Ke Liye

Best Director
 Muzaffar Ali – Umrao Jaan 
K. Balachander – Ek Duuje Ke Liye
Rabindra Dharmraj – Chakra
Ramesh Talwar – Baseraa
Sai Paranjpye – Chashme Buddoor
Shyam Benegal – Kalyug

Best Actor
 Naseeruddin Shah – Chakra 
Amitabh Bachchan – Laawaris
Amitabh Bachchan – Silsila
Kamal Haasan – Ek Duuje Ke Liye
Rajesh Khanna – Dard

Best Actress
 Smita Patil – Chakra 
Hema Malini – Naseeb
Jaya Bachchan – Silsila
Raakhee – Baseraa
Rati Agnihotri – Ek Duuje Ke Liye
Rekha – Umrao Jaan

Best Supporting Actor
 Amjad Khan – Yaarana 
Amjad Khan – Love Story
Rakesh Roshan – Dhanwan
Saeed Jaffrey – Chashme Buddoor
Suresh Oberoi – Laawaris

Best Supporting Actress
 Supriya Pathak – Kalyug 
Aruna Irani – Rocky
Madhavi – Ek Duuje Ke Liye
Nanda – Ahista Ahista
Sarika – Sharda

Best Comic Actor
 Utpal Dutt – Naram Garam 
Anoop Kumar – Chalti Ka Naam Zindagi
Asrani – Ek Duuje Ke Liye
Rakesh Bedi – Chashme Buddoor
Ravi Baswani – Chashme Buddoor

Best Story
 Kudrat – Chetan Anand 
Baseraa – Leela Phansalkar
Chakra – Jaywant Dalvi
Ek Duuje Ke Liye – K. Balachander
Kalyug – Shyam Benegal and Girish Karnad

Best Screenplay
 Ek Duuje Ke Liye – K. Balachander

Best Dialogue
 Meri Awaaz Suno – Kader Khan

Best Music Director 
 Umrao Jaan – Mohammed Zahur Khayyam 
Armaan – Bappi Lahiri
Ek Duuje Ke Liye – Laxmikant–Pyarelal
Love Story – R.D. Burman
Silsila – Shiv-Hari

Best Lyricist
 Ek Duuje Ke Liye – Anand Bakshi for Tere Mere Beech Main 
Baseraa – Gulzar for Jahan Pe Savera
Ek Duuje Ke Liye – Anand Bakshi for Solah Baras Ki
Kranti – Santosh Anand for Zindagi Ki Naa Toote
Love Story – Anand Bakshi for Teri Yaad Aa Rahi Hai

Best Playback Singer, Male
 Love Story – Amit Kumar for Teri Yaad Aa Rahi Hai 
Ek Duuje Ke Liye – S.P. Balasubramaniam for Tere Mere Beech Main
Kudrat – Kishore Kumar for Humein Tumse Pyaar Kitna
Prem Geet – Jagjit Singh for Honthon Se Chulo Tum
Yaarana – Kishore Kumar for Choo Kar Mere Mann Ko

Best Playback Singer, Female
 Kudrat – Parveen Sultana for Humein Tumse Pyaar Kitna 
Armaan – Sharon Prabhakar for Mere Jaisi Haseena
Armaan – Usha Uthup for Rambha Ho
Laawaris – Alka Yagnik for Mere Angne Main
Poonam – Chandrani Mukherjee for Mohabbat Rang Laayegi

Best Art Direction
 Chakra – Bansi Chandragupta

Best Cinematography
 Kudrat – Jal Mistry

Best Editing
 Ek Duuje Ke Liye – K. R. Kitoo

Best Sound
 Kalyug – Hitendra Ghosh

Special Award 
Padmini Kolhapure – Ahista Ahista

Critics' awards

Best Film
 Aadarshila

Best Documentary
 Faces After the Storm

Biggest Winners
 Kalyug – 3/5
 Ek Duuje Ke Liye – 3/13
 Kudrat – 3/4
 Chakra – 3/6
 Umrao Jaan – 2/3

References

 https://www.imdb.com/event/ev0000245/1982/

See also
 31st Filmfare Awards
 30th Filmfare Awards
 Filmfare Awards

Filmfare Awards
Filmfare